Claire Supiot (born 28 February 1968) is a French swimmer. She competed in the women's 200 metre butterfly at the 1988 Summer Olympics and won silver medal in the 400 m freestyle event at the 1987 Mediterranean Games.

Supiot was diagnosed with Charcot-Marie-Tooth disease in 2007 and started para swimming in 2015. She won medals at the 2018 World Para Swimming European Championships and the 2019 World Para Swimming Championships.

References

External links
 
 
 Claire Supiot at the Fédération Française de Natation 

1968 births
Living people
French female butterfly swimmers
French female medley swimmers
Olympic swimmers of France
Swimmers at the 1988 Summer Olympics
Mediterranean Games medalists in swimming
Mediterranean Games silver medalists for France
Swimmers at the 1987 Mediterranean Games
Medalists at the World Para Swimming Championships
Medalists at the World Para Swimming European Championships
Sportspeople from Angers
French female freestyle swimmers
S8-classified Paralympic swimmers